Alsop House may refer to:

Richard Alsop IV House, Middletown, Connecticut, also known as Alsop House and designated a National Historic Landmark under that name
Carroll Alsop House, Oskaloosa, Iowa, a Frank Lloyd Wright-designed home